B. Wongar (born 1932 as Sreten Božić) is a Serbian-Australian writer. For most of his literary career, the concern of his writing has been, almost exclusively, the condition of Aboriginal people in Australia. His 1978 short story collection, The Track to Bralgu, was released to critical acclaim by the foreign press, who were led to believe by publisher Little Brown that Wongar was of Aboriginal ethnicity. The revelation that Wongar was a Serbian immigrant, as well as inconsistencies in his life story, have led to controversy and allegations of literary hoax and cultural appropriation.

Early life 

Božić grew up in the village of Gornja Trešnjevica, near Aranđelovac, Serbia, then Kingdom of Yugoslavia. In the mid-1950s, he started his writing career by writing poetry which he published in the Mlada kultura and the Novi vesnik literary journals. He was a member of the "Đuro Salaj" workers-writers group in Belgrade, Yugoslavia. At the same time he worked as a journalist in Serbia. Yugoslav communists found his writing politically incorrect and banned him from journalism for life. In 1958 he moved to Paris, France, where he lived in a Red Cross refugee camp. There he met Jean-Paul Sartre and Simone de Beauvoir who helped him to publish his literary works in Les Temps Modernes.

Literary career 

Božić arrived in Australia in 1960. In his search for a job (as a construction worker or miner), he bought a camel in order to cross the Tanami Desert. He got lost and was close to death when he was saved by a tribal man. Božić lived with tribal Aboriginal people for ten years. The name B(anumbir) Wongar, which means morning star and messenger from the spirit world, was said to be given to him by his tribal wife Dumala and her relatives. However, he later stated in an interview that "B." is in recognition of his Serbian name.

From Dumala he learned about Aboriginal poetry and their traditional way of life in the bush. This way he was introduced to the Aboriginal culture that had been suppressed and delegitimized by British colonial power for centuries. His book The Track to Bralgu is a collection of stories based on traditional Aboriginal stories belonging to the Yolngu people of Arnhem Land, NT, Australia. The book was translated into French as Le Chemin du Bralgu, from the original manuscript and published in Les Temps Modernes (1977), a magazine which was edited by Sartre and de Beauvoir. When the book appeared in the English edition a year later, it heralded a new genre of creative writing and brought international fame to the author. In Australia, however, Wongar was criticized for his portrayal of Aboriginal people, and there was a campaign to discredit his work as fake.

He was not allowed to stay any longer in the Northern part of Australia and had to move to Melbourne. His wife Dumala and the children were to follow but they died from drinking water from a poisoned well, as claimed later in Dingoes Den, his autobiography (at the end of Chapter 12).

While he was in the Northern part of Australia, Wongar worked on his Totem and Ore photographic collection, also known under the title Boomerang and Atom. The collection contained several thousand black-and-white photographs portraying the impact of uranium mining and the British nuclear testing on tribal Aborigines. In 1974, Wongar was asked to send some of the Totem and Ore photographs for an exhibition in the Parliament House Library in Canberra. The exhibition was shut down two days after the official opening.

Wongar settled on his bush property Dingo Den in Gippsland, south of Melbourne where, helped by photographic images from his Totem and Ore collection, he wrote his "Nuclear Trilogy", comprising the novels, Walg, Karan, and Gabo Djara. The trilogy was first published in Germany, translated from the original manuscript by Annemarie and Heinrich Böll. The English language edition first appeared in 1988. It was launched at the Aboriginal Research Centre, Monash University, where Wongar at the time was serving as writer-in-residence. While he was at work, police raided Wongar's home at Dingo Den and took some of his work, including the sole copy of the manuscript of his new novel Raki. In 1990, the Australian author Thomas Shapcott spoke about the case at the opening of the Adelaide Arts Festival. He circulated a petition asking the state authorities to see that the confiscated manuscript Raki be returned to Wongar. About 200 writers at the festival signed the petition. It took Wongar about 5 years to write Raki again. This was followed by his new book Didjeridu Charmer, which will complete his nuclear series, thus making the series a quintet.

For not knowing any English when he arrived to Australia, when he begin writing in the early 1970s, his written English followed no standards.

Wongar's books have been translated into 13 languages with over one million copies sold (as of 2006). His books are the most widely known literary representation of Australian Aboriginal culture.

Reception of Wongar's work in Australia
Reception of Wongar's work has oscillated between praise, sceptical inquiry and moral condemnation. Within Australia there is a widespread obsession with Wongar's biographical credentials to the extent that it eclipses any review of the fictional texts as part of Australian writing. There are a variety of Wongar's moral indictments ranging from being a white who usurped Aboriginal culture to the claim saying that all artists are charlatans, who con the public. Susan Hosking claimed that Wongar did not speak as an Aboriginal person but pretended to be one. Aboriginal writers were finding their own voice and, she claims, there was a strong resistance against such a European writer, because it was seen as a cultural imperialism. Australian critic Maggie Nolan responded that a reductive demand for an authentic Aboriginality functions as cultural imperialism. Far from being labelled as a cultural imperialist, Wongar shall be congratulated for subtly manipulating expectations of authenticity in his work. Wongar questions the systematic closure of Aboriginality as an imperial construct, its pretensions to its authenticity, autonomy, and purity.

Wongar has received criticism to the point of being labelled a fake, literary hoax and accused of cultural appropriation. Australian novelist and playwright Thomas Keneally has said, "Time might prove him to be a highly significant Australian writer, but his deception has soured his reception in the English-speaking world." Much of this centres around his identify, as there are many discrepancies regarding the identify of Wongar in the forewords of his books. In his book, The Track to Bralgu, the foreword states that Wongar is part Aboriginal, while in his book The Sinners, the foreword states that Wongar is in fact a mixed race American Vietnam veteran.

Comparing the German translation of the Walg by Annemarie Böll (Der Schoß) to its English version published by Brazier in 1990, T. Caiter wrote that the English edition was censored. The English edition was substantially and carefully purged of colonialist pornography and pseudo-Aboriginal mythology. In his autobiography, Dingoes Den, Wongar wrote that the German translation remains the only complete text and unabridged version.

Awards and honors
 Arvon Foundation Poetry Award. UK, 1980
 The American Library Association Award (USA), 1982
 Senior Writer's Fellowship, Australian Literature Board, 1985
 The P.E.N. International Award (USA) for Nuclear Cycle 1986
 Writer-in-residence at the Aboriginal Research Centre at Monash University in the late 1980s

 Australia Council Writers’ Emeritus Award, 1997

 Honorary Doctorate, University of Kragujevac, Serbia, 2009

Works by B. Wongar 
 Diddjeridu Charmer, Dingo Books 2015, 
 Manhunt, B. Wongar 2008, 
 Dingoes Den, ETT Imprint 2006, 
 The Last Pack of Dingoes, HarperCollins Publishers (Australia) 1993 
 Gabo Djara: A Novel of Australia, George Baziller 1991, 
 Raki: a novel (1997), London: Marion Boyars 
 Totem and ore: a photographic collection (2006), Dingo Books, Carnegie, Victoria 2006 
 The New Guinea Diaries (1997) — English translation of "The New Guinea Diaries 1871–1883" by Nicholas Miklouho-Maclay, Dingo Books, Victoria, Australia 
 Walg: A Novel of Australia, George Braziller 1983, 
 Karan, Dodd Mead 1985, 
 The Trackers: a novel (1975), Outback Press, Collingwood, VIC.

Appearances on television and film 

 "Dingoes, Names and B. Wongar" – interview with Jan Wositzky, for ABC Radio National's 'Books and Writing' program
 Sorena Productions, Australia, Director/Writer John Mandelberg (1994) "A Double Life. The Life and Times of B.Wongar" 56-minute video documentary on his life.
 All Inclusive Films, Art & Popcorn, Melbourne, Australia, Director Andrijana Stojkovic (2018) "Wongar" 60-minute documentary on his life

References

Sources

External links 
 
 Sreten Božić Vongar by Dragoslav Simić, Audio i foto arhiv
 Museum Victoria Collections: B. Wongar, Author (circa 1932 -)

Australian writers
Australian people of Serbian descent
Serbian writers
1932 births
Living people
People from Aranđelovac
Cultural appropriation